The French Federation of Speleology (FFS), is a French organisation that represents all persons practicing or studying caving and canyoning and promotes the study and conservation of caves.

History

Société de spéléologie (1895–1914)
Between 1895 and 1900 the society published a journal entitled Spelunca. The society folded in 1914 at the start of World War I.

Spéléo-club de France (1930–1936)
After the First World War, French speleology was represented mainly by Norbert Casteret and Robert de Joly, who continued the interrupted work of Martel's .

Members of the organisation included: Martel (Honorary Chairman), de Joly (Chairman), Degrully (Vice President), Casteret, Bernard Gèze, l'Abbé Giry, Guy de Lavaur, Fournier, Milhau and Contejean, among others. The goal of the club was to liaise between cavers and help develop the activities of miners underground. The association offered assistance (including financial) to cavers and prepared special legislation for the exploration, discovery and exploitation of underground systems.

The  published a quarterly newsletter and a Spelunca journal (2nd  series) for the publication of scientific papers and detailed accounts of exploration.

Société spéléologique de France (1936–1963)
The intention was to give national status to a hitherto only regional group. The SSF admitted subsidiaries and affiliates. It also continued the publication of Spelunca. The first national speleological conference took place in Mazamet in 1939.

Unlike the First World War, the war of 1939–1945 saw no cessation of underground exploration. However, in 1944, the caves served as refuges for members of the French Resistance. Volume X of the Spelunca 2nd series was published during German occupation. After the war, the face of French caving had completely changed.

In 1945, various government agencies recognised the value of groundwater studies:
 The  (CNRS) established a commission of speleology including Fage, Gèze, René Jeannel, Félix Trombe, Vandel, etc., who founded a laboratory of biospeology in the Muséum national d'Histoire naturelle in Paris;
 The  (BRGG, later BRGM), or the Bureau of Geological and Geophysical Research, was entrusted by Gèze with the task of drawing up an inventory of cavities (work by Rouire resumed in 1948);
 The , or the French National Committee of Geodesy and Geophysics, contained a section for hydrology on which cavers were present (Bourgin, Norbert Casteret, Bernard Gèze and Félix Trombe).

With the help of these organisations and with support from well-known names such as Bernard Gèze, in 1946 the  began publication, under the double label of the SSF and the CAF. This was the 3rd series of Spelunca.

In 1948, the headquarters of the SSF were transferred to those of the BRGG.

Comité national de spéléologie (1948–1963)

On 28 May 1948, Jeannel met in Paris with the presidents of the clubs known to cavers as well as various eminent speleologists, under the auspices of the CNRS. The CNS consisted of the chairpersons of speleological organisations and some exceptional personalities who had "contributed in particular, for their work in the development of French caving". The inaugural committee comprised 21 organisation representatives or individuals, most of whom were scientists. Among the members was Robert de Joly, as well as the then Minister of Youth Affairs and Sports, Pierre Bourdan.

Members the first committee and the first office:
 President: René Jeannel
 Vice-President: Pierre Chevalier
 Secretary: Guy de Lavaur

Since the body's inception, members of the CNS knew that they needed to produce a publication in which to express their developments. In 1948, the newsletter Grottes et gouffres appeared in three issues. Simultaneously, the SSF ceased publication of its periodical bulletin to provide its official information bulletin in the new CNS.

From 1952, cave training courses were organised in partnership with the Ministry of Youth Affairs and Sports.

From 1953, Guy Lavaur organised cave diving activities. In conjunction with the Fédération nationale de sauvetage (National Rescue Federation), a certificate of first degree fitness was created in 1954.

The first International Congress of Speleology was held in Paris from 7–12 September 1953 under the patronage of the Minister of National Education, as well as the Minister for Youth Affairs and Sports. This dual sponsorship was intended to mark the recognition of both scientific and recreational caving. The conference consisted of seven sections of work: hydrogeology and karst morphology, physical chemistry, meteorology and crystallography, biology, human habitat, surveying and topography, photo and film and equipment and techniques of exploration. More than one hundred papers and a dozen films were presented.

In 1957, an amendment was made to the constitution of the CNS making it an association of clubs (not club presidents), to the exclusion of individual members. The financial situation became extremely difficult, firstly because of its intense activity and partly because of the production of numerous publications including the Proceedings of the International Congress of 1953.

At the general meeting of the CNS appointed 10 May 1958, Geo Marchand was designated to organise the 2nd National Congress of Speleology in Cahors in 1959, with the group , of which he was President. Three hundred cavers from the CNS and the SSF took part in the event, from 6–10 September 1959. It gave rise to the presentation of 26 papers and five different films and inspired in the participants a desire for unification.

The year 1961 was particularly active, and saw the first Bulletin of the CNS take the name of Spelunca (4th series), under the double patronage CNS-SSF.

French Federation of Speleology (1963 onwards)

After a consultation of cavers on 1 June 1963, at the national convention of Millau, the CNS and SSF assembled to form the French Federation of Speleology (FFS).

On 3 June 1963, the new board elected the first office of the federation, which was composed of:

 President: André Cavaillé
 Vice-President: Guy de Lavaur and Paul Dubois
 Secretary: Geo Marchand (now honorary president of the FFS)
 Assistant Secretary: Jean Lautier
 Treasurer: René Nuffer
 Assistant Treasurer : Claude Pommier

The FFS then resumed publication of the Spelunca 4th series newsletter with four issues per year. In 1981, printing began on the current (5th) series of Spelunca, with a new format and numbering system.

The FFS has gradually emerged as an entity representative of French caving. It is now delegated public tasks in the field of education, civil protection and promotion of caving practice in all its forms. It has maintained a membership of approximately 7,500 for the last ten years.

References

External links

Caving organizations
Caving in France
Sports organizations of France
Organizations established in 1963
1963 establishments in France